The sudrophone is a brass instrument invented by the French instrument maker François Sudre (1844–1912). Its shape resembles that of an ophicleide. It was patented in 1892.

A sudrophone has a conical bore and three or four Perinet valves. The "valve" nearest the mouthpiece on the bell throat controls a silk membrane to create a nasal effect, which Sudre designed to make a sound like a cello or a bassoon. The instrument is very similar to the baritone horn and helicon. Acoustically these resembled the saxhorns, but the shape was different as the main tube was doubled back on itself, giving a vertical appearance reminiscent of an ophicleide, this design choice was made by Sudre to make the instrument stand out more amongst the primarily saxhorn-shaped brass instruments that were much more popular.

The unique feature of these instruments was an apparatus on the side of the bell throat called a "mirliton" (kazoo), with a membrane which would vibrate sympathetically with its pitch, creating a kazoo-like effect.  The apparatus allowed the player to either engage or disengage the membrane, so it could also function as a normal saxhorn, albeit with a unique outside shape and narrow bell.

References

External links
 Demonstration of a sudrophone

1892 musical instruments
Brass instruments